Hialeah station is a Metrorail rapid transit station in Hialeah, Florida. The station is located at the intersection of East First Avenue and 21st Street (SR 934), just south of Hialeah Park Race Track. It was opened to service May 19, 1985.

Station layout
The station has two tracks and an island platform, with parking underneath the tracks on either side of the station.

Places of interest

Hialeah
Hialeah Park Race Track

References

External links
MDT – Metrorail Stations
Station from Google Maps Street View

Green Line (Metrorail)
Metrorail (Miami-Dade County) stations in Miami-Dade County, Florida
Railway stations in the United States opened in 1985
1985 establishments in Florida
Transportation in Hialeah, Florida